Thomas Bonnin (born 10 May 1989 in Orléans) is a French racing cyclist.

Palmares
2010
1st Stage 4 Giro della Valle d'Aosta
2nd Tour des Pays de Savoie
7th Tour de l'Avenir

References

1989 births
Living people
French male cyclists
Sportspeople from Orléans
Cyclists from Centre-Val de Loire